This list of museums in New York is a list of museums, defined for this context as institutions (including nonprofit organizations, government entities, and private businesses) that collect and care for objects of cultural, artistic, scientific, or historical interest and make their collections or related exhibits available for public viewing. Museums that exist only in cyberspace (i.e., virtual museums) are not included. Also included are non-profit art centers and galleries.

The following museums are in New York but their lists are maintained separately:
 List of museums in New York City
 List of museums on Long Island for museums in Nassau and Suffolk counties
 List of university art museums and galleries in New York State

The list
Museums in New York State besides those in NYC, Long Island, or universities are:

Defunct museums
 Balmanno Cottage, Geneva, formerly operated by the Geneva Historical Society, closed in 2013
 Boswell Museum, Springfield Center, no longer any physical museum, just a website, preserves music of the 1920s and 1930s
 Bridgewater Auto Museum, Bridgewater, closed in 1989 after the death of Walt Meyer, its founder
 Campbell-Whittlesey House Museum, Rochester, closed in 2010
 Cudner-Hyatt House, Scarsdale, formerly operated by the Scarsdale Historical Society
 Deansboro Music Museum, Deansboro
 Dinosaur Walk Museum, Riverhead, closed in 2008, branches still exist in Branson, Missouri
 Goudreau Museum of Mathematics in Art and Science, New Hyde Park, closed in 2006
 Greenwood Museum
 Harwood’s Grist Mill Farm, East Hartford
 Ithaca College Museum of Art
 Museum of Cartoon Art, Port Chester, became the National Cartoon Museum when the collection moved to Boca Raton, Florida in 1992
 Museum of Long Island Natural Sciences, formerly operated by Stony Brook University
 Museum of the Peaceful Arts
 National Soccer Hall of Fame and Museum, Oneonta, museum closed in 2010, inductions will continue
 Noteworthy Indian Museum, Amsterdam
 Pedaling History Bicycle Museum, Orchard Park, closed in 2009
 Professional Wrestling Hall of Fame and Museum, Amesterdamn Move to Wichita Falls, TX in 2016
 Rail City Historical Museum, Sandy Creek, closed in 2015
 Retro Arcade Museum, Beacon, website
 Ticonderoga Cartoon Museum, Ticonderoga, closed in 2010
 Tired Iron Tractor Museum, Cuylerville, collection of vintage farm machinery, tractors, trucks, horse-drawn equipment, farm toys, sold in 2013, photos
 Toy Town Museum, East Aurora, closed in 2009

Regions

The "Region" column in the sortable table can be used to help locate museums and understand which museums are in the same area. The list uses regions made up of the following counties or boroughs:
Adirondack Region (counties all or partly in the Adirondack Park, except counties in the Capital District): Clinton, Essex, Franklin, Fulton, Hamilton, Herkimer, Lewis, Oneida, Saratoga, St. Lawrence, Warren, and Washington counties.
Buffalo Niagara Region: Allegany, Cattaraugus, Chautauqua, Erie, Genesee, Niagara, Orleans, and Wyoming counties.
Capital District: Albany, Schenectady, Rensselaer, Columbia, Greene and Saratoga counties.
Central Leatherstocking: Broome, Delaware, Chenango, Madison, Montgomery, Otsego, Oswego, Schoharie counties.
Finger Lakes: Onondaga County, Cortland County, Tioga County, Chemung County, Tompkins County, Cayuga County, Seneca County, Wayne County, Monroe County, Livingston County, Ontario County, Yates County, Schuyler County, and Steuben County.
Lower Hudson: Putnam, Rockland, and Westchester counties.
Long Island: Nassau and Suffolk counties.
Mid-Hudson: Dutchess, Orange, Sullivan, and Ulster counties.
New York City: Boroughs of Brooklyn, Bronx, Manhattan, Queens and Staten Island

See also
 List of museums in New York City
 List of museums on Long Island for museums in Nassau and Suffolk counties
 List of university art museums and galleries in New York State
 List of nature centers in New York

References

External links

I Love New York - official state tourism guide
New York State Canals
New York State Office of Parks, Recreation and Historic Preservation
NYC Arts - Culture Guide and Calendar
New York State Department of Environmental Conservation

Defunct museums
 Balmanno Cottage, Geneva, formerly operated by the Geneva Historical Society, closed in 2013
 Boswell Museum, Springfield Center, no longer any physical museum, just a website, preserves music of the 1920s and 1930s
 Bridgewater Auto Museum, Bridgewater, closed in 1989 after the death of Walt Meyer, its founder
 Campbell-Whittlesey House Museum, Rochester, closed in 2010
 Cudner-Hyatt House, Scarsdale, formerly operated by the Scarsdale Historical Society
 Deansboro Music Museum, Deansboro
 Dinosaur Walk Museum, Riverhead, closed in 2008, branches still exist in Branson, Missouri
 Goudreau Museum of Mathematics in Art and Science, New Hyde Park, closed in 2006
 Greenwood Museum
 Harwood’s Grist Mill Farm, East Hartford
 Ithaca College Museum of Art
 Museum of Cartoon Art, Port Chester, became the National Cartoon Museum when the collection moved to Boca Raton, Florida in 1992
 Museum of Long Island Natural Sciences, formerly operated by Stony Brook University
 Museum of the Peaceful Arts
 National Soccer Hall of Fame and Museum, Oneonta, museum closed in 2010, inductions will continue
 Noteworthy Indian Museum, Amsterdam
 Pedaling History Bicycle Museum, Orchard Park, closed in 2009
 Professional Wrestling Hall of Fame and Museum, Amesterdamn Move to Wichita Falls, TX in 2015
 Rail City Historical Museum, Sandy Creek, closed in 2015
 Retro Arcade Museum, Beacon, website
 Ticonderoga Cartoon Museum, Ticonderoga, closed in 2010
 Tired Iron Tractor Museum, Cuylerville, collection of vintage farm machinery, tractors, trucks, horse-drawn equipment, farm toys, sold in 2013, photos
 Toy Town Museum, East Aurora, closed in 2009

Regions

The "Region" column in the sortable table can be used to help locate museums and understand which museums are in the same area. The list uses regions made up of the following counties or boroughs:
Adirondack Region (counties all or partly in the Adirondack Park, except counties in the Capital District): Clinton, Essex, Franklin, Fulton, Hamilton, Herkimer, Lewis, Oneida, Saratoga, St. Lawrence, Warren, and Washington counties.
Buffalo Niagara Region: Allegany, Cattaraugus, Chautauqua, Erie, Genesee, Niagara, Orleans, and Wyoming counties.
Capital District: Albany, Schenectady, Rensselaer, Columbia, Greene and Saratoga counties.
Central Leatherstocking: Broome, Delaware, Chenango, Madison, Montgomery, Otsego, Oswego, Schoharie counties.
Finger Lakes: Onondaga County, Cortland County, Tioga County, Chemung County, Tompkins County, Cayuga County, Seneca County, Wayne County, Monroe County, Livingston County, Ontario County, Yates County, Schuyler County, and Steuben County.
Lower Hudson: Putnam, Rockland, and Westchester counties.
Long Island: Nassau and Suffolk counties.
Mid-Hudson: Dutchess, Orange, Sullivan, and Ulster counties.
New York City: Boroughs of Brooklyn, Bronx, Manhattan, Queens and Staten Island

See also
 List of museums in New York City
 List of museums on Long Island for museums in Nassau and Suffolk counties
 List of university art museums and galleries in New York State
 List of nature centers in New York

References

External links

I Love New York - official state tourism guide
New York State Canals
New York State Office of Parks, Recreation and Historic Preservation
NYC Arts - Culture Guide and Calendar
New York State Department of Environmental Conservation

 
Museums
New York
Museums